Malo Vaga (born April 12, 1965) is a Samoan professional football manager and referee. From 2002 to 2003 he coached the Samoa national football team. After a nine-year break, he began coaching the Samoa national football team again in January 2012.

References

External links
Profile at Soccerway.com
Profile at Soccerpunter.com

1965 births
Living people
Samoan football managers
Samoa national football team managers
Place of birth missing (living people)